Pat Thomas Graham (born May 25, 1961) is a Canadian retired ice hockey player. He played 103 games in the National Hockey League with the Pittsburgh Penguins and Toronto Maple Leafs between 1981 and 1984.

Graham was forced to retire from hockey due to chronic back problems. Following his retirement he earned his chiropractic degree and began working with the Toronto Blue Jays. In 2010, Graham opened his own chiropractic clinic with Dr. Sean Fletch, a former Guelph University football player.

Career statistics

Regular season and playoffs

References

External links
 

1961 births
Living people
Adirondack Red Wings players
Baltimore Skipjacks players
Canadian ice hockey left wingers
Erie Blades players
Niagara Falls Flyers players
Pittsburgh Penguins draft picks
Pittsburgh Penguins players
St. Catharines Saints players
Ice hockey people from Toronto
Toronto Maple Leafs players
Toronto Marlboros players